Carterville is a city in Williamson County, Illinois, United States. At the 2020 census, the city's population was 5,848. The city is part of the Carbondale-Marion combined statistical area and has grown considerably as a residential community of Carbondale and Marion.

The city is located next to Crab Orchard National Wildlife Refuge. The Refuge's  of land and water contain a wide diversity of flora and fauna.

History
Carterville was founded by George Monroe McNeill and Laban Carter. McNeill married Olive Herrin of Herrin's Prairie and in 1866 they settled on the farm now known as Carterville. Carter came to Williamson County in 1864, purchased  of land, and helped organize and secure a post office for Carterville in 1871. The town was named in his honor. McNeill was one of the youngest members of the Union army during the American Civil War. He enlisted at 16 and was with General William T. Sherman during his March to the Sea.

Geography

Demographics

As of the census of 2000, there were 4,616 people, 1,933 households, and 1,293 families residing in the city. The racial makeup of the city was 96.21% White, 1.13% African American, 0.15% Native American, 0.93% Asian, 0.02% Pacific Islander, 0.58% from other races, and 0.97% from two or more races. Hispanic or Latino of any race were 1.13% of the population.

There were 1,933 households, out of which 32.1% had children under the age of 18 living with them, 54.4% were married couples living together, 10.0% had a female householder with no husband present, and 33.1% were non-families. 28.0% of all households were made up of individuals, and 10.8% had someone living alone who was 65 years of age or older. The average household size was 2.39 and the average family size was 2.95.

In the city the population was spread out, with 25.2% under the age of 18, 10.0% from 18 to 24, 28.1% from 25 to 44, 23.1% from 45 to 64, and 13.6% who were 65 years of age or older. The median age was 36 years. For every 100 females, there were 93.9 males. For every 100 females age 18 and over, there were 91.0 males.

The median income for a household in the city was $36,969, and the median income for a family was $44,722. Males had a median income of $34,231 versus $24,924 for females. The per capita income for the city was $18,884. About 9.9% of families and 14.6% of the population were below the poverty line, including 15.4% of those under age 18 and 7.1% of those age 65 or over.

Education
Carterville is home to John A. Logan College, named for the local American Civil War hero and politician John A. Logan.  A college of approximately 8,000 students, John A. Logan College was featured in Rolling Stone  magazine as the nation's fifth best community college and in 2004 was recognized as one of the fastest growing community colleges in the nation.

Carterville High School received a silver medal and ranked 94th in Illinois on U.S. News & World Reports 2016 list of the nation's best high schools. CHS was the only public high school in southern Illinois that performed above the state average of 21 on ACT testing.

The Carterville Unit 5 Schools' athletic programs have been successful in the past, winning the IHSA State Conference Championship in Class 3A football in 1996 and in Class 2A softball in 2008 and 2016. The Carterville Varsity Cheer squad hold the record for the most wins in IHSA history.

Notable people
C. W. Bishop, Congressman, Carterville city clerk and postmaster
Mark Gottfried, college basketball coach
George Monroe McNeill, founder
Rodney Watson, college basketball coach

References

Further reading
 Angle, Paul M. (1992). Bloody Williamson - A Chapter in American Lawlessness. University of Illinois Press. .
 Erwin, Milo. 1876, Rep. 1976. History of Williamson County, Illinois. Marion, Ill.: Williamson County Historical Society.
 Erwin, Milo, and Jon Musgrave. 2006. The Bloody Vendetta of Southern Illinois. Marion, Ill.: IllinoisHistory.com. 
 Spence, Jennifer and Sheri Hunter. 2011. Carterville, Cambria & Crainville:  A Look Back At Our Towns. .

External links

 Crab Orchard National Wildlife Refuge
 Carterville Unit No. 5 Schools
 John A. Logan College
 Carterville, IL Library
 Carterville Chamber of Commerce

Cities in Williamson County, Illinois
Populated places established in 1866
1866 establishments in Illinois
Cities in Illinois